Jean-Pierre "JP" Eloff (born 28 May 1991) is an American rugby union player who plays  Fullback for the Chicago Hounds in Major League Rugby (MLR) and also for the United States national rugby union team.

Eloff played college rugby at Davenport University in Grand Rapids, Michigan. He led the Davenport Panthers to a D1-AA title in his freshman year, and was named as the 2011 college player of the year. and was chosen as an All-American for the 2011 National All-Star Championships.

Professional career
Eloff debuted with the U.S. national team at the 2016 Americas Rugby Championship.

Eloff signed with the Ohio Aviators in the newly formed PRO Rugby competition in early 2016.
In October 2017, JP Eloff signed with New Orleans Gold for the inaugural season of Major League Rugby.

In September 2018, it was announced that Eloff had been selected for the USA Selects roster for the 2018 Americas Pacific Challenge.

JP Eloff is the younger brother of Philip Eloff, who also played for the U.S. national team at the 2003 and 2007 Rugby World Cups.

References

American rugby union players
Ohio Aviators players
New Orleans Gold players
Rugby union players from Pretoria
1991 births
Living people
United States international rugby union players
Rugby union fullbacks
Rugby union fly-halves
Chicago Hounds (rugby union) players
South African expatriate sportspeople in the United States
South African expatriate rugby union players
Expatriate rugby union players in the United States
Naturalized citizens of the United States
Davenport University alumni
South African rugby union players